Francis George Monkland (8 October 1854 – 15 January 1915) was an English first-class cricketer. He was a right-handed batsman and an underarm right arm slow bowler who played mainly for Gloucestershire County Cricket Club from 1874 to 1879. Monkland was born at Trichinopoly, Madras Presidency, India.

Monkland made 31 first-class appearances, scoring 534 runs @ 13.69 with a highest innings of 59, which was his sole half-century. He took 11 catches in his career but no wickets as he was only an occasional bowler.

Monkland died at Regent's Park, London on 15 January 1915.

References

1854 births
1915 deaths
English cricketers
English cricketers of 1864 to 1889
Gloucestershire cricketers
Sportspeople from Tiruchirappalli
Gentlemen cricketers
Cricketers from Tamil Nadu
North v South cricketers